Iustin Ștefan Frățiman, also known as Frațman or Frățimanu (Yustin Stepanovich Fratsman, or Фрациман, Fratsiman; June 1, 1870 – September 23, 1927), was a historian, educator, librarian and political figure from Bessarabia, active in the Russian Empire and the Kingdom of Romania. After receiving a classical education, he worked for various seminaries of the Russian Orthodox Church, moving as far north as Olonets. Frățiman had settled in Soroca by the time of World War I, becoming a champion of Romanian nationalism. This resulted in his being exiled to Central Asia until 1917. Allowed back home after the liberal February Revolution, he resumed his activism, openly campaigning for the national rights of Romanians east of Bessarabia. He was afterwards one of the educators tasked with institutional Romanianization by the Moldavian Democratic Republic. 

Frățiman welcomed the union of Bessarabia with Romania in 1918, being an outspoken in his adversity toward Bolshevik Russia; in parallel, he supported autonomy for the Chișinău Archbishopric within the Romanian Orthodox Church. Though elected a corresponding member of the Romanian Academy, he was at odds with the new cultural establishment, especially after a controversial stint as head of Bessarabia's Central Library. Frățiman was not considered for a position at Iași University, and spent his final years lecturing at regional teachers' colleges, before dying in poverty. His final political involvement was with the League of Christian Bessarabians, a far-right group.

Biography

In the Russian Empire
The Frățimans originated in Western Moldavia, but were known to have settled in the Bessarabian area around the time of its Russian annexation in 1812. Their descendant A. L. Aizenshtadt suggests that the family was of unclear ethnic origins, noting that their surname is of Moldavian dialectal origin, from frați ("brothers"). As early as 1812, a Teodor Frățiman was attested as a parish priest of the Moldavian Orthodox Church in Cuhureștii de Jos (Nizshie Kugureshty). His male descendants were also primarily employed as clergymen or catechists for the Russian Orthodox Church. Some biographical records suggest that Iustin's father was schoolteacher Paul Frățiman, who was fluent in Greek and Church Slavonic; others suggest that Iustin was one of seven children (five sons and two daughters) born to the priest Ștefan Frățiman and his wife Irina (née Tuchkovska). A cousin, Petru Frățiman (born 1859 or 1859), was already politically active in 1879, joining Axentie Frunză's circle of left-wing radical youths.

Iustin was born in Cuhureștii de Jos on June 1, 1870—the village was administered at the time by the Russian Empire, within the Bessarabian Governorate. He attended the Orthodox Seminary in Kishinev (Chișinău), graduating in 1892, and afterwards served as its administrator, before moving to the Faculty of Theology in Kazan; he graduated in 1897. He was finally a graduate of Petersburg University. Frățiman began his teaching career in 1899, when he was appointed tutor of Greek at the Theological Seminary in Pskov; in June 1904, he took a similar posting in Lyskovo, but left to take up an administrative position in Saint Petersburg. Iustin's works of the period included a biographical essay about the Moldavian bishop Iacob Stamati, published in Russian in 1901. He later resumed work as a teacher: in 1910, he taught Greek and Latin at the Seminary in Olonets. Though admired for his erudition, he received poor marks for his educational performance, including his harshness toward students and his tendency of questioning orders he received from the rectorate. By 1912, to the satisfaction of his superiors, Frățiman had been reassigned to the Orthodox Seminary of Pinsk.

In 1914–1915, Frățiman had returned to Bessarabia and was employed by the Normal School in Soroca. His training allowed him to teach religion, French language, and world history; his brother Petru had similar interests and, in 1904, helped establish the Bessarabian Historical and Archeological Society. Highly educated for a Bessarabian of that era, Frățiman also obtained a diploma from the Imperial Institute of Archeology, being inducted as a full member in 1907. His career was interrupted when he began campaigning for the Romanian Latin alphabet and drew suspicion as a "Romanianphile". According to historian Paul Vataman, Frățiman was also punished for his personal stash of banned books, in various languages. In summer 1916, Russian officials had him detained at the penitentiary of Soroca, and subsequently deported to Central Asia, in Turgay Oblast; some authors suggest that he was also held in Siberia.

Frățiman was still absent from Bessarabia during the February Revolution, following which Bessarabia embarked on a process of self-rule, and eventually united with Romania. In May–June 1917, he attended the Moldavian Teachers' Congress in Odessa, where he spoke about the issue of Romanian Bessarabian communities in Novorossiya. His resolution, backed by the other delegates, was that Romanian villages in towns should be allowed secular and religious instructions in "Moldavian", rather than the official Russian. Moreover, the Congress pressed for a "Romanian bishopric" to be formed at Dubăsari. Authors such as Onisifor Ghibu and C. Gh. Constantinescu also mention that Frățiman had specifically asked for Romanian-inhabited places in Kherson and Odessa areas to be merged into Bessarabia.

Romanian career
Returning to Bessarabia that July, Frățiman joined a corpus of teacher tasked with Romanianizing Bessarabian schools, which included the adoption of Latin spellings; he also taught the history of Romania. In October, he applied for a position at his alma mater, the Theological Seminary, affirming his intention to teach all his classes in Romanian. Frățiman failed the examination, with preference being given to the more experienced George Tofan and Liviu Marian. Still pursuing an interest in the study of local history and ethnology, he helped establish in early 1918 a Historical and Literary Society (named after Bogdan Petriceicu Hasdeu), and was admitted into the Romanian Academy of Bucharest. From January 1918, Frățiman was a member of the School Board in the Moldavian Democratic Republic, which had been created as a self-governing entity from the old Bessarabia Governorate.

In February, Frățiman participated in the opening ceremony of Chișinău People University, and gave a speech outlining his critique of Bolshevik Russia. It described various instances of Rumcherod soldiers engaging in vandalism throughout Bessarabia. The following month, the republican assembly, Sfatul Țării, gave its endorsement to the Romanian–Bessarabian unification process. In June, he traveled to Iași as a delegate of Chișinău Archbishopric, negotiating the return of Bessarabian parishes under the authority of the Moldavian Metropolis within the enlarged Romanian Orthodox Church. Frățiman and his colleagues attempted to preserve some administrative rights for their regional church, but were instantly rebuked by Metropolitan Pimen, who asked that they submit to the Romanian state in all matters, including religious. 

During elections in November 1919, Frățiman tried but failed to win a seat in the Deputies' Assembly, enlisting with the minor Independent Party of Bessarabia alongside Ludovic Dauș, Sergiu Niță, and Constantin Stere. Frățiman's contribution to the union process also included an article in România Nouă magazine, which argued that the Romanians of Novorossiya needed to be settled back in Greater Romania, and that Romanian cultural artifacts in Russia had to be repatriated. In December 1919, he was also co-opted by the Cultural League for the Unity of All Romanians, joining its local executive committee—where he served with Romulus Cioflec, Paul Gore, Alexandru Ouatul and others. He eventually returned to settle in Chișinău, where he taught at the Teacher Seminary for Girls; he was not considered for a position at the new Theology Faculty of Iași University, which was operating in the same city. Frățiman's sympathies soon veered into far-right politics—on December 15, 1920, he joined Nicolae Negru's League of Christian Bessarabians, which also recruited former members of the Union of the Russian People.

As noted by fellow historian Nicolae Iorga, Frățiman's academic work comprised studies "of small proportions", but showed his "deep familiarity with sources dealing on the life of his own people, on either side of the Dniester." In 1921, Hasdeu Society published Frățiman's monograph regarding church and secular administration among the Romanians of Novorossiya—specifically, in areas now known as "Transnistria". It provided an overview of Romanian localities which, Frățiman argued, existed already in the 1760s under Ottoman Ukraine, and were only reinforced by a "New Moldavian" colonization under Grigory Potemkin. Frățiman's final activities included his teaching position at Chișinău People's University, in which capacity he also replaced Teodor Porucic as head of Chișinău Central Library (1921–1923). Historian Nina Negru notes that his mandate was not renewed because Frățiman "did not play the games of politics", causing him great distress. Scholar Maria Vieru-Ișaev provides a different interpretation, namely that Frățiman was a "nonconformist", who proved himself "difficult" in his relations with the state bureaucracy. Although demoted in 1922, he refused to turn in the library's inventory until February 1923. 

Frățiman subsequently withdrew to a life of poverty. In November 1926, Pan Halippa employed him at Astra cultural society's Bessarabian Literary and Philological Section, where he worked alongside Paul Gore. Frățiman died September 23, 1927 and was buried in his native village. Eleven years after his death, Bessarabia was occupied by the Soviet Union. In the newly established Moldavian SSR, Frățiman's scholarly contribution was simply ignored, with no mention being made of his name in specialized reference works. Following the independence of Moldova in 1991, Frățiman was the subject of encyclopedic entries, topical articles, and conferences. In 2013, his grave was restored and topped with a new stone cross, donated by Paul Gore Society and the Association of Christian Orthodox Students.

Notes

References
A. L. Aizenshtadt, "Мои предки на службе Православной церкви", in Гомельщина: вехи истории. Материалы регионального научно-​исторического семинара, pp. 19–24. Gomel: BelGUT, 2019.  
Luminița Cornea, "'Urmele' Basarabiei in viața și activitatea lui Romulus Cioflec", in Angvstia. Istorie, Vol. 11, 2007, pp. 211–224.
Nicolae Iorga, "Cronică", in Revista Istorică, Vol. XIV, Issues 1–3, January–March 1928, pp. 74–96.
Dinu Poștarencu, "Aportul lui George Tofan la naționalizarea învățământului din Basarabia", in Analele Bucovinei, Vol. XXIII, Issue 1, 2016, pp. 65–78.
Andrei Prohin, "O conferință consacrată lui Iustin Frățiman", in Limba Română, Issue 6/2020, pp. 454–458.
Florin Rotaru, Românitatea transnistreană. Antologie. Bucharest: Editura Semne, 1996.
Vladimir Sorokin, "Митрополит Ленинградский и Новгородский Григорий (Чуков) и его церковно-просветительская деятельность", in Bogoslovskie Trudy, Vol. 29, 1989, pp. 127–181.

1870 births
1927 deaths
Russian ethnographers
Romanian ethnographers
Moldovan ethnographers
19th-century historians from the Russian Empire
20th-century Russian historians
20th-century Romanian historians
20th-century Moldovan writers
20th-century Romanian writers
Romanian male writers
Moldovan male writers
Romanian classical scholars
Russian classical scholars
Historians of the Russian Orthodox Church
Historians of Ukraine
Corresponding members of the Romanian Academy
19th-century civil servants
20th-century Romanian civil servants
Civil servants of the Russian Empire
Politicians of the Moldavian Democratic Republic
Romanian political candidates
Romanian nationalists
Romanian anti-communists
Moldovan civil servants
Romanian civil servants
Romanian schoolteachers
Moldovan librarians
Romanian librarians
Moldovan activists
Romanian activists
People from Florești District
Romanian people of Moldovan descent
Members of the Russian Orthodox Church
Members of the Romanian Orthodox Church
Russian exiles in the Russian Empire